The New Swedish Movement was a far-right political movement in Sweden that emphasized strong Swedish nationalism, corporatism and anti-communism as well as a cult of personality around Per Engdahl.

Engdahl founded the organization in 1941 under the name "Swedish opposition" (Svensk Opposition) after Engdahl and his supporters broke away from the National League of Sweden. He designated the group's ideology as nysvenskhet (roughly, New Swedishness). During World War II the party supported the Third Reich. Despite this, the party overtly rejected National Socialism, instead looking more towards Benito Mussolini for inspiration while also seeking to unify all groups against democracy, whether they were fascist or not. According to Swedish archives the group had 8632 members played a central role in the attempt to create a European association of fascist parties and associations, the European Social Movement (ESM).

IKEA founder Ingvar Kamprad was a member from 1942 until at least 1945.

External links
The New Swedish Movement
Nonkonform

References

Anti-communism in Sweden
Far-right politics in Sweden
Political parties established in 1941
Defunct political parties in Sweden
Swedish nationalism
1941 establishments in Sweden